Evgeny Sviridov may refer to:

Evgeny Sviridov (violinist) (born 1989), Russian violinist
Evgeni Sviridov (figure skater) (born 1974), Uzbekistani figure skater
Evgeniy Sviridov (bandy) (born 1974), Belarusian bandy player